Princesses is a 2005 Spanish drama film directed and written by Fernando León de Aranoa which stars Candela Peña and Micaela Nevárez. Set in the onset of the 21st century in Madrid, the plot concerns the friendship developed between a Spanish prostitute and a Dominican prostitute, Caye and Zulema, respectively.

Plot
Caye (Candela Peña) goes to Gloria's Hair Salon which she frequents and where she discusses with other customers everything from life to politics during her time off; they are also her friends. They share a dislike of the immigrant prostitutes they observe from the salon, because some of them, including Caye, are also prostitutes and believe the immigrants take clients and income they would otherwise have.

Caye's point of view changes when she meets Zulema (Micaela Nevárez), an illegal immigrant prostitute working to send money home to her mother and her son Edward who she left in the Dominican Republic. They develop a bond and support each other with everything, including shopping, fashion tips and hair styles.

Caye takes Zulema to her mother's house for dinner. Caye's phone constantly rings but she refuses to answer, something her mother is confused and bothered about. Zulema volunteers to teach sex education at Caye's sister-in-law's school, enabling her to send a toy truck to her son for his birthday.

Caye meets Manuel, a computer programmer, outside a club. With some persuasion, Caye convinces him to go with her. Over beers at a café, Caye confesses she is a prostitute. Manuel does not believe her and laughs it off and they begin a relationship.

Zulema tells Caye about a man who physically abuses her but has promised her papers to legalize her status in Spain and allow her to bring her family to Spain. Caye is suspicious of the offer and begs Zulema not to go with him. Caye's theory proves true, the man wishes simply to use Zulema and never had any intentions of getting her legal status. Zulema escapes a first meeting with him when Caye comes to help, but is later lured to a hotel room, where the client turns out to be him, and she is beaten and presumably raped.  After Zulema has consensual sex with a compassionate "volunteer", she goes to the hospital for a full medical examination, something she had not done for many years. When Zulema sees the test results, she collapses. While her medical status is not stated, it is implied that her condition is fatal and communicable and she arranges to meet with her abuser and has unprotected sex with him in an act of revenge.

While at the hospital with Zulema, Caye receives a call from a client requesting her services for himself and his friends. Caye heads to the cafe where they have arranged to meet. There she runs into Manuel and a group of his co-workers and realizes that it was Manuel and his friends who are requesting her services and thus learns of Manuel's infidelity. Manuel meanwhile realizes that Caye was not joking about her profession. Without saying a word, they both understand the situation and go their separate ways.

Devastated over her health issue, Zulema decides to return to the Dominican Republic. With a heartfelt but bittersweet good-bye, Caye gives Zulema a makeover and an envelope of cash and asks her to “go be happy”. That afternoon, while having dinner with her family, Caye announces that Zulema has returned to the Dominican Republic because she was a prostitute and could no longer bear the emotional burden of the profession and distance from her son. The film concludes with Caye's cellphone again incessantly ringing, her mom asking her whether she is going to answer or not and Caye simply retorting, “¡Cógelo tú mamá!” ("You answer it, mom").

Cast

Release 
The film was theatrically released in Spain on 2 September 2005. It was released in the United States in August 2006 at the IFC Center in New York City and nationally to many digital cable subscribers via IFC OnDemand.

Production 
The film was produced by Reposado Producciones Cinematográficas and Mediapro.

Soundtrack
The film includes "Me Llaman Calle", a song by world music artist Manu Chao, which earned the film a Goya award for Best Original Song. The title translates to 'They Call Me Street', and is also a reference to one of the main characters, Caye, whose name sounds phonetically similar to 'calle' in Spanish.
"Cinco Razones", also by Manu Chao, appears at several significant points in the plot development.

Awards and nominations

|-
| align = "center" rowspan = "15" | 2006 || rowspan = "9"  | 20th Goya Awards || colspan = "2" | Best Film ||  || rowspan = "9" | 
|-
| Best Original Screenplay || Fernando León de Aranoa ||  
|-
| Best Actress || Candela Peña || 
|-
| Goya Award for Best New Actress || Micaela Nevárez ||  
|-
| Goya Award for Best New Actor || Luis Callejo || 
|-
| Best Costume Design || Sabine Daigeler || 
|-
| Best Sound || Miguel Rejas, Alfonso Raposo, Polo Aledo || 
|-
| Best Original Song || "Me llaman calle" by Manu Chao || 
|-
| Best Makeup an Hairstyles || Carlos Hernández, Manolo García || 
|-
| 11th Forqué Awards || colspan = "2" | Best Film ||  || 
|-
| rowspan = "5" | 15th Actors and Actresses Union Awards || Best Film Actress in a Leading Role || Candela Peña ||  || rowspan = "5" | 
|-
| rowspan = "2" | Best Film Actress in a Minor Role || Mariana Cordero || 
|-
| Violeta Pérez || 
|-
| Best Film Actor in a Minor Role || Luis Callejo || 
|-
| Best New Actress || Micaela Nevárez || 
|}

Sundance Film Festival
Grand Jury Prize: World Cinema – Dramatic (Fernando León de Aranoa)

See also 
 List of Spanish films of 2005

References
Citations

Bibliography

External links
 

2005 films
2000s Spanish-language films
Films about prostitution in Spain
Films featuring a Best Actress Goya Award-winning performance
Films shot in Madrid
Films directed by Fernando León de Aranoa
Spanish erotic drama films
2000s erotic drama films
2005 drama films
Films set in the 2000s
Films set in Madrid
Films about immigration to Spain
2000s Spanish films